Francis Kwame Buah was a Ghanaian historian, educationist, author and politician. He was the Minister for Education of Ghana between 1980 and 1981 and the Minister for Trade and Tourism prior to that. He authored a number of history text books.

Educational career
Buah was the headteacher of the Tema Senior High School (formerly Tema Secondary School) in Ghana.

Politics
In 1979, Buah was appointed by Hilla Limann, who was the president of Ghana as the Minister for Trade and Industry. In 1980, he was moved to be the Minister for Education. He held this position until the Limann government was overthrown by the Armed Forces Revolutionary Council led by Jerry Rawlings in December 1981. He has published many history text books. The last, "Government in West Africa" was published when he was 83 years old.

Publications

References

Year of birth missing
Year of death missing
Education ministers of Ghana
Trade ministers of Ghana
People's National Party (Ghana) politicians
20th-century Ghanaian politicians
20th-century historians